State Route 208 (SR 208) is a short 1.44 mile long north-south state highway in Ripley, Tennessee. For its entire length, SR 208 is known as Cleveland Street.

Route description

SR 208 begins in downtown at an intersection with SR 209 (Monroe Street), and it curves to the north to have an intersection with Lake Drive. It then heads northwest as a recently improved 2-lane highway with a center turn lane as it passes through neighborhoods. The highway then passes through farmland, where it crosses over a creek, before entering a business district and coming to an end at an intersection with US 51/SR 3 (Jefferson Davis Street).

Major intersections

References

208
Transportation in Lauderdale County, Tennessee